Vedat Muriqi (born 24 April 1994) is a Kosovan professional footballer who plays as a striker for La Liga club Mallorca and the Kosovo national team.

Club career

Teuta Durrës
On 14 January 2013, Muriqi had a trial at Kategoria Superiore club Teuta Durrës and after impressing in a friendly match signed a one-and-a-half year contract with the club. On 4 February 2013, he made his debut with Teuta Durrës in the 2012–13 Albanian Cup quarter-finals against Bylis after being named in the starting line-up. On 23 February 2013, he made his league debut in a 1–1 away draw against Tirana after coming on as a substitute in the 46th minute in place of Daniel Xhafaj.

Loan at Besa Kavajë
On 5 January 2014, Muriqi was loaned out to Kategoria Superiore club Besa Kavajë until the end of the 2013–14 season. On 1 February 2014, he made his debut against Laçi after coming on as a substitute at 46th minute in place of Shaqir Stafa and scored his side's second goal during a 2–2 home draw.

Giresunspor
On 18 August 2014, Muriqi signed a two-year contract with TFF First League club Giresunspor. On 14 September 2014, he made his debut in a 0–1 home defeat against Adana Demirspor after coming on as a substitute at 78th minute in place of David Solomon Abwo.

Gençlerbirliği
On 31 May 2016, Muriqi signed a three-year contract with Süper Lig club Gençlerbirliği. On 21 August 2016, he made his debut against Gaziantepspor after coming on as a substitute at 64th minute in place of Cosmin Matei and scored his side's second goal during a 2–0 home win.

Çaykur Rizespor
On 11 January 2018, Muriqi signed to TFF First League side Çaykur Rizespor. Ten days later, he made his debut in a match against Manisaspor after being named in the starting line-up and scoring two goals during a 0–3 away win.

Fenerbahçe
On 7 July 2019, Muriqi completed a transfer to Süper Lig side Fenerbahçe by signing for the next four seasons. One day later, the club confirmed that Muriqi had joined on a permanent transfer. On 19 August 2019, he made his debut against Gaziantep after being named in the starting line-up and scored his side's second goal during a 5–0 home win.

Lazio
On 15 September 2020, Muriqi signed a five-year deal with Serie A club Lazio. On 17 October 2020, he made his debut in a 3–0 away defeat against Sampdoria after coming on as a substitute at 59th minute in place of Felipe Caicedo. Three days after debut, Muriqi played against Borussia Dortmund in the 2020–21 UEFA Champions League to become the first player of the Kosovo national team to feature in the competition.

Mallorca
On 31 January 2022, Muriqi was loaned out to La Liga club Mallorca until the end of the 2021–22 season. Mallorca reportedly paid a €1 million loan fee. His debut with Mallorca came two days later in the 2021–22 Copa del Rey quarter-finals against Rayo Vallecano after being named in the starting line-up. Three days after debut, he made his league debut against Cádiz after being named in the starting line-up and scored his side's second goal during a 2–1 home win.

On 22 July 2022, the clubs agreed on a permanent transfer and Muriqi signed a five-year contract with Mallorca.

International career

Under-21

Kosovo
In June 2013, Muriqi was named as part of the Kosovo U21 squad for 2013 Valais Youth Cup. On 12 June 2013, he made his debut with Kosovo U21 in 2013 Valais Youth Cup semi-final against Ghana U20 after being named in the starting line-up and scored the draw goal in the 41st minute.

Albania
On 15 October 2013, Muriqi made his debut with Albania U21 in a 2015 UEFA European Under-21 Championship qualification match against Bosnia and Herzegovina U21 after coming on as a substitute at 46th minute in place of Herolind Shala.

Senior
On 30 August 2016, Muriqi received a call-up from Kosovo for a 2018 FIFA World Cup qualification match against Finland. On 9 October 2016, he made his debut with Kosovo in a 2018 FIFA World Cup qualification match against Ukraine after being named in the starting line-up.

Style of play and reception
Muriqi is known for his headers and strength. Former Turkish international and World Cup semi-finalist Rüştü Reçber described Muriqi as an "ideal centre forward", praising his speed in confined spaces in field, aerial dominance, and his team play capabilities, in 2019.

Former Turkish international and World Cup semi-finalist Hakan Ünsal underlined his strength, ball containing and shooting abilities, in 2019. Okan Buruk, former Turkish international, World Cup semi-finalist and former Çaykur Rizespor manager who coached Muriqi stated that Muriqi dramatically improved during his latter season at club, due to his extra trainings, describing him reliable and labelling him "best forward in Turkey in that period".

Former Turkish international and pundit Rıdvan Dilmen praised Muriqi, stating: "There are some forwards. They might be short and quick. Some are powerful. Some are tall, like Peter Crouch, who can get the ball on ground. Muriqi possesses all [of these]. If he could play alongside Alex, he could have scored 25 goals [in a season]", on 21 September 2019.

Personal life
Muriqi was born in Prizren, FR Yugoslavia (now Kosovo) to Kosovo Albanian parents. In addition to his Kosovan and Albanian citizenship, he acquired Turkish citizenship in July 2015 under the naturalized name Vedat Muriç.

Career statistics

Club

International

Scores and results list Kosovo's goal tally first, score column indicates score after each Muriqi goal.

Honours
Individual
 La Liga Player of the Month: May 2022

References

External links
Profile at the RCD Mallorca website

1994 births
Living people
Kosovan footballers
Kosovo under-21 international footballers
Kosovo international footballers
Kosovan expatriate footballers
Kosovan expatriate sportspeople in Albania
Kosovan expatriate sportspeople in Turkey
Kosovan expatriate sportspeople in Italy
Kosovan expatriate sportspeople in Spain
Albanian footballers
Albania under-21 international footballers
Albanian expatriate footballers
Albanian expatriate sportspeople in Turkey
Albanian expatriate sportspeople in Italy
Albanian expatriate sportspeople in Spain
Turkish footballers
Turkish expatriate footballers
Turkish expatriate sportspeople in Albania
Turkish expatriate sportspeople in Italy
Turkish expatriate sportspeople in Spain
Naturalized citizens of Turkey
Turkish people of Kosovan descent
Turkish people of Albanian descent
Association football forwards
Football Superleague of Kosovo players
KF Liria players
Kategoria Superiore players
KF Teuta Durrës players
Besa Kavajë players
TFF First League players
Giresunspor footballers
Süper Lig players
Gençlerbirliği S.K. footballers
Çaykur Rizespor footballers
Fenerbahçe S.K. footballers
Serie A players
S.S. Lazio players
La Liga players
RCD Mallorca players
Expatriate footballers in Italy
Expatriate footballers in Spain
Sportspeople from Prizren